Diatraea is a genus of moths of the family Crambidae.

Species
Diatraea albicrinella Box, 1931
Diatraea andina Box, 1951
Diatraea argentina Box, 1931
Diatraea bellifactella Dyar, 1911
Diatraea brunnescens Box, 1931
Diatraea busckella Dyar & Heinrich, 1927
Diatraea castrensis Dyar & Heinrich, 1927
Diatraea cayennella Dyar & Heinrich, 1927
Diatraea centrellus (Möschler, 1883)
Diatraea considerata Heinrich, 1931
Diatraea crambidoides (Grote, 1880)
Diatraea dyari Box, 1930
Diatraea evanescens Dyar, 1917
Diatraea fuscella Schaus, 1922
Diatraea gaga Dyar, 1914
Diatraea grandiosella Dyar, 1911
Diatraea guatemalella Schaus, 1922
Diatraea impersonatellus (Walker, 1863)
Diatraea indigenella Dyar & Heinrich, 1927
Diatraea instructella Dyar, 1911
Diatraea lativittalis (Dognin, 1910)
Diatraea lentistrialis Hampson, 1919
Diatraea lineolata (Walker, 1856)
Diatraea lisetta (Dyar, 1909)
Diatraea magnifactella Dyar, 1911
Diatraea maronialis Schaus, 1922
Diatraea minimifacta Dyar, 1911
Diatraea mitteri Solis, 2015
Diatraea muellerella Dyar & Heinrich, 1927
Diatraea myersi Box, 1935
Diatraea pedibarbata Dyar, 1911
Diatraea postlineella Schaus, 1922
Diatraea ragonoti Box, 1948
Diatraea rufescens Box, 1931
Diatraea saccharalis (Fabricius, 1794)
Diatraea schausella Dyar & Heinrich, 1927
Diatraea strigipennella Dyar, 1911
Diatraea suffusella Box, 1931
Diatraea tabernella Dyar, 1911
Diatraea venosalis (Dyar, 1917)
Diatraea veracruzana Box, 1956

Former species
Diatraea amazonica Box, 1931
Diatraea amnemonella Dyar, 1911
Diatraea angustella Dyar, 1911
Diatraea balboana Box, 1956
Diatraea colombiana Box, 1956
Diatraea entreriana Box, 1931
Diatraea flavipennella Box, 1931
Diatraea guapilella (Schaus, 1913)
Diatraea luteella Box, 1931
Diatraea maritima Box, 1935
Diatraea morobe (Dyar, 1916)
Diatraea obliqualis Hampson, 1919
Diatraea pittieri Box, 1951
Diatraea rosa Heinrich, 1931
Diatraea savannarum Box, 1935
Diatraea silvicola Box, 1951
Diatraea umbrialis Schaus, 1922

References

Chiloini
Crambidae genera